KZZU-FM (92.9 MHz 92.9 ZZU) is a commercial FM radio station in Spokane, Washington.  The station airs an Adult Top 40 radio format which the station describes as "Today's Modern Hit Music".  KZZU-FM is owned by Morgan Murphy Media, with the license held by QueenB Radio.

KZZU-FM has studios and offices with other Morgan Murphy stations on West Boone Avenue in Spokane.  The transmitter is also in Spokane, off South Krell Ridge Lane, on Krell Hill, also known as "Tower Mountain."  Programming is no longer heard on translator station K223AN at 92.5 MHz in Coeur d'Alene, Idaho.

History

KREM-FM
In September 1955, the station signed on as KREM-FM, the first FM station in Spokane.  KREM-FM was co-owned with AM 970 KREM (now KTTO).  KREM had been founded by Cole E. Wylie in 1946 and operated as a 250-watt station in Spokane. In a 1977 interview with radio broadcaster historian Richard Dunning, KREM was described as the "first non-network, independent, all music station" in Spokane.  KREM had also put a television station on the air in 1954, a year before KREM-FM signed on. KREM-TV carried ABC and DuMont Television Network programming at first, but today is a CBS Network affiliate.

In the 1950s and 60s, when few people owned FM radios, KREM-FM simulcast the AM station's programming.  In 1958, KREM-AM-FM-TV were acquired by the Seattle-based King Broadcasting Company.  Under King Broadcasting ownership, KREM-AM-FM became a Top 40 station, vying with KJRB for Spokane's young radio listeners.  KREM-FM switched to a progressive rock format in the late 1960s, while the AM continued its Top 40 format.  Around 1980, KREM-FM moved to a more structured album-oriented rock format, with a playlist of the top tracks from the best selling rock LPs.

Switch to KZZU
In 1984, the radio stations were sold to Highsmith Broadcasting, while King Broadcasting kept KREM-TV.  At the time, different stations could not share the same call sign if they had different owners, with the AM becoming KLHT (due to its "light music" soft adult contemporary format), while the FM station became KZZU-FM.

The station called itself "KZZU The Zoo" and "93 Zoo FM", spearheaded by Program Director Bill Stairs. The Top 40 format once heard on the AM station was switched to the FM station, complete with a "morning zoo".  The "93 Zoo FM Breakfast Boys' Morning Show" (first hosted by Jim Arnold and Craig Johnson, then Arnold and Dave Sposito, then later with Sposito and Ken Hopkins) played the top hits and discussed pop culture.  Popular KZZU DJs at the time included Jamie Patrick, Lyn Daniels, Casey Christopher, Sean Rivers, Kevin James, Steve Hawk, Paul Gray, Rachel Brooks, Doug Inman and Jeffrey Parker.

Rhythmic to Rock and the end of Zoo FM

Through the 1980s and 1990s, KZZU aired a mainstream top 40 format.  As the 1990s went on, the format shifted toward a more rhythmic contemporary direction with a slight focus on Hip Hop artists from the inland Northwest. In the early 2000s, changing tastes towards rock music and increased competition caused KZZU to move more towards a rock-leaning Top 40 as hip hop music fell to the lower end of its playlist. In its last year as "93 Zoo FM", the station was noted in having an all-female DJ line up with the exception of Rick Dees and Hollywood Hamilton on Sundays. The rock leaning focus lead to some talk of a format adjustment.

From Zoo FM to ZZU

On October 17, 2005, KZZU dropped the "Zoo FM" moniker in favor of "92.9 ZZU", and shifted to Adult Top 40 in order to more effectively compete with KCDA.  The new format left Spokane without a mainstream top 40 outlet for five years.  The new format initially leaned alternative as KZZU removed all the hip hop from its playlist.  Core artists included The Killers, Audioslave, Switchfoot and Green Day.  Co-owned "Wired 96.9 KEZE" became Spokane's station for hip hop, R&B and rhythmic pop and dance product.  KZZU's new format reunited the Breakfast Boys with Molly Allen, although the station stopped using "The Breakfast Boys" moniker.  Dave, Ken, Molly and producer Dan Roberts host the station's morning show, targeting an 18 to 49 year old demographic.

Adult Top 40
In 2008, after the change of sister station KEZE from Rhythmic Top 40 to Country, KZZU somewhat returned to its CHR roots by adding some rhythmic music during the evening hours while maintaining the Adult Top 40 format during the daytime.

In 2011, KEZE dropped AAA (who adopted the format from KXLY-FM the year prior as part of a format swap) and returned to Rhythmic Contemporary music as "Hot 96.9."  The format flip on 96.9 resulted in KZZU dropping most rhythmic music to avoid overlapping with KEZE, though it would retain some rhythmic tracks.  For a time, Mediabase and Nielsen BDS described KZZU as a Hot AC outlet. KZZU was reclassified as Adult Top 40 it when Mapleton Communications-owned KZBD dropped alternative rock for CHR, becoming "105.7 Now FM."

Notable Personalities
Molly Allen- morning radio personality with Dave Sposito and Ken Hopkins. Also daughter of actress Ellen Travolta and niece of actor John Travolta.

References

External links

Morgan Murphy Media stations
ZZU-FM
ZZU-FM
Adult top 40 radio stations in the United States
Radio stations established in 1955
1955 establishments in Washington (state)